The women's team compound archery competition at the 2018 Asian Games was held from 22 to 28 August at Gelora Bung Karno Archery Field.

A total of 13 teams participated in the ranking round to determine the seeds for knockout round.

Schedule
All times are Western Indonesia Time (UTC+07:00)

Results

Ranking round

Knockout round

References

External links
Official website

Women's team compound